Eugène de Lamerlière, full name Hugues-Marie Humbert Bocon de La Merlière, (Saint-Marcellin (Isère) 5 January 1797 – Blida (Algeria), ca. 1841) was a French writer and playwright.

Biography 
Born into a family of the nobility of the Dauphiné of which he was the last representative, he studied law at Grenoble, then joined the army in 1812. From 1814 to 1817 he was part of the military house of Louis XVIII

In 1819, he moved to Paris and became a friend of Charles Nodier who introduced him into the literary circles. He made his debut in literature in 1821 with a sentimental novel, Souvenirs de madame Jenny L..

The success he obtained with some of his plays performed in Paris allowed him to establish a dramatic performance center in Lyon (1824). He presented there some fifty plays (drama, comedy and vaudeville), very few of which have been published.

In 1836, he bought the newspaper Le Commerce of which he was editor until 1840.

In 1841, he settled in Algeria at Blida. No trace of him is found after that date

Works 
Some of his plays were given in Lyon and Paris (Théâtre des Variétés), most of them now completely forgotten.

1822: Le Comédien de Paris ou Assaut de travestissements, vaudeville in 1 act, with Armand d'Artois
1822: L'Amateur à la porte, ou la Place du Louvre, vaudeville in 1 act, with Édouard-Joseph-Ennemond Mazères
1822: Le Matin et le soir, ou la Fiancée et la mariée, comedy in 2 acts, mixed with couplets, with Armand d'Artois and René-André-Polydore Alissan de Chazet
1823: Stanislas, ou la Sœur de Christine, vaudeville in 1 act, with Emmanuel Théaulon
1824: Le Monstre
1824: Le Damné
1825: L'Actrice chez elle, ou C'est ma femme, comédie en vaudevilles in 1 act
1827: Sainte-Périne, ou l'Asile des vieillards, tableau-vaudeville in 1 act, with Théaulon and Armand Joseph Overnay
1828: L'Amoureux de sa tante, ou Une heure de jalousie, vaudeville in 2 acts
1828: Le Départ pour la Grèce, ou l'Expédition de la Morée, à-propos-vaudeville in 1 act
1829: Les Martyrs lyonnais, ou la Ligue de 1829, à-propos in verses
1830: Napoléon, ou la Vie d'un grand homme, contemporary drama in 3 acts and in 10 tableaux
1830: Laurette, ou 3 mois à Paris, comédie en vaudevilles in 3 acts and in 3 periods, with Charles-Joseph Chambet
1830: Le Drapeau tricolore, ou Trois journées de 1830, à propos patriotique in 3 tableaux, mixed with couples and extravaganza
1830: La Lyonnaise, song
1831: L'Ile de Scio, ou la Délivrance de la Grèce, ballet héroïque in 3 acts
1835: Poleska, sœur de Christine, vaudeville in 1 act, with Théaulon
1837: Sous Constantine, à-propos-vaudeville in 1 act, mixed with couplets, with Joachim Duflot
1837: Les Giboulées de mars, April Fools' Day in 11 pieces
1840: Mazagran, ou les 123, military à-propos in three parts, with Duflot
1840: Lyon en 1840, an account of the floods that harmed this city and the Rhône department
1856: Le Sourd, ou l'Auberge pleine, comedy in 1 act, with Desgroseillez, Pierre Jean Baptiste Choudard Desforges and Charles-Gaspard Delestre-Poirson
 Adieux à Paris et autres opuscules

Bibliography 
 Adolphe Rochas, Biographie du Dauphiné, 1860, p. 23 
 Edmond Maignien, Dictionnaire des ouvrages anonymes et pseudonymes du Dauphiné, 1892
 Albert Albertin, André Albertin, Histoire contemporaine de Grenoble et de la région dauphinoise, 1900, p. 508
 Eugène Vial, Paul Mariéton, Marceline Desbordes-Valmore et ses amis lyonnais, 1923, p. 67
 Sylvie Vielledent, 1830 aux théâtres, 2009, p. 121

References 

1797 births
Year of death missing
People from Saint-Marcellin, Isère
19th-century French dramatists and playwrights